The following lists events that happened during 1954 in Australia.

Incumbents

Monarch – Elizabeth II
Governor-General – Sir William Slim
Prime Minister – Robert Menzies
Chief Justice – Sir Owen Dixon

State Premiers
Premier of New South Wales – Joseph Cahill
Premier of Queensland – Vince Gair

State Governors
Governor of New South Wales – Sir John Northcott
Governor of Queensland – Sir John Lavarack
Governor of South Australia – Sir Robert George
Governor of Tasmania – Sir Ronald Cross, 1st Baronet
Governor of Western Australia – Sir Charles Gairdner

Events
 3 February – Elizabeth II arrives in Sydney on her first visit as monarch
 13 February – Mawson Station in the Australian Antarctic Territory is established
 During February, a cyclone hits the Gold Coast and northern New South Wales, killing 26
 1 March - Adelaide and large parts of southern South Australia are shaken by a 5.6 magnitude earthquake, resulting in the injuries of 16 people, and a damage bill of £17 million (2017: $578 million). 
 3 April – Vladimir Petrov, a Soviet diplomat, defects to Australia, sparking the Petrov Affair
 Shirley Bliss wins the Miss Australia Quest
 On 31 October, the first Vickers Viscount aircraft delivered to Australia crashed at Mangalore Airport while on a training flight only days after its arrival in Australia, killing 3 of the 7 people on board.

Science and technology
 The Australian Academy of Science is established.

Arts and literature

 Ivor Hele wins the Archibald Prize with his portrait of Rt Hon R G Menzies, PC, CH, QC, MP
 Charles Bannon wins the Blake Prize for Religious Art with his work Judas Iscariot
 Overland literary magazine is founded, edited by Stephen Murray-Smith

Sport

 Cricket
 New South Wales wins the Sheffield Shield
 Football
 Brisbane Rugby League premiership: Wests defeated Brothers 35-18
 New South Wales Rugby League premiership: South Sydney defeated Newtown 23-15
 South Australian National Football League premiership: won by Port Adelaide
 Victorian Football League premiership: Footscray defeated Melbourne 102-51
 Golf
 Australian Open: won by Ossie Pickworth
 Australian PGA Championship: won by Kel Nagle
 Horse Racing
 Rising Fast wins the Caulfield Cup
 Rising Fast wins the Cox Plate
 Rising Fast wins the Melbourne Cup
 Motor Racing
 The Australian Grand Prix was held at Southport and won by Lex Davison driving a HWM Jaguar
 Tennis
 Australian Open men's singles: Mervyn Rose defeats Rex Hartwig 6-2 0–6 6-4 6-2
 Australian Open women's singles: Thelma Coyne Long defeats Jenny Staley Hoad 6-3 6-4
 Davis Cup: Australia is defeated by the United States 2–3 in the 1954 Davis Cup final
 Wimbledon: Rex Hartwig and Mervyn Rose win the Gentlemen's Pairs
 Wimbledon: Jaroslav Drobný defeats Ken Rosewall 13–11 4–6 6–2 9–7 in the Gentlemen's Singles
 Yachting
 Kurrewa IV takes line honours and Solveig IV wins on handicap in the Sydney to Hobart Yacht Race

Births
 10 January – Greg Towns, footballer
 25 January – Kay Cottee, sailor
 26 January – Kim Hughes, cricketer
 27 April – Mark Holden, singer and media personality
 1 May – Garry Who, actor and comedian
 2 May – Don Cameron, water polo player and coach
 19 May – Phil Rudd, musician
 27 May – Pauline Hanson, politician
 30 June – Wayne Swan, Deputy Prime Minister of Australia
 2 July – Scott W. Sloan, professor of civil engineering (died 2019)
 11 July – Paul Blackwell, actor (died 2019)
 11 August – Wally Carr, boxer (died 2019) 
 12 August – Rob Borbidge, Premier of Queensland
 2 September – Gai Waterhouse, horse trainer
 13 September – Steve Kilbey, musician
 20 September – James Moloney, author
 27 September – Ray Hadley, 2GB radio announcer
13 October – Banduk Marika, Indigenous artist and printmaker (died 2021)
 15 October – Steve Bracks, 44th Premier of Victoria
 24 October – Malcolm Turnbull, 29th Prime Minister of Australia
 12 November – Paul McNamee, tennis player
 22 November – Carol Tomcala, sports shooter
 26 November – Jacki MacDonald, media personality
 28 November – John McMartin, Pastor, ACC State President NSW, National Executive 
 29 November – Steve Rogers (died 2006), Rugby league footballer

Deaths
 10 January – Chester Wilmot, war correspondent (b. 1911)
 19 September – Miles Franklin, writer and feminist (b. 1879)
 14 November – Inigo Owen Jones, meteorologist and farmer (born in the United Kingdom) (b. 1872)
 22 November – Roy Rene, comedian (b. 1891)

See also
 List of Australian films of the 1950s

References

 
Australia
Years of the 20th century in Australia